The teams competing in Group 8 of the 2000 UEFA European Under-21 Championship qualifying competition were Croatia, Republic of Ireland, Yugoslavia, Macedonia and Malta.

Standings

* Match originally ended as a 0–0 draw, but UEFA later awarded the match as a 3–0 forfeit win to Republic of Ireland due to Macedonia including ineligible players in their squad.

Matches
All times are CET.

Originally ended 0–0. Later awarded as 3–0 win for Republic of Ireland due to Macedonia fielding a suspended player.

Goalscorers
8 goals
 Tomo Šokota

5 goals
 Goran Drulić

4 goals

 Branko Jelić
 Mateja Kežman

3 goals

 Ivan Leko
 Mihael Mikić
 Renato Pilipović
 Ardian Đokaj

2 goals

 Boško Balaban
 Zvonimir Deranja
 George Mallia
 Antoine Zahra
 Vladimir Ivić
 Nikola Lazetić
 Marko Pantelić

1 goal

 Igor Bišćan
 Anthony Šerić
 Dario Smoje
 Jurica Vranješ
 Stephen Baker
 Barry Conlon
 Daryl Clare
 Neale Fenn
 Colin Hawkins
 Kevin Kilbane
 Alan Lee
 Alan Mahon
 Martin Rowlands
 David Worrell
 Dejan Dimitrovski
 Stojan Ignatov
 Michael Galea
 Massimo Grima
 Malcolm Licari
 Carlo Mamo
 Branko Bošković
 Ivica Francišković
 Saša Ilić
 Veljko Paunović
 Jovan Tanasijević
 Ivan Vukomanović

1 own goal
 William Camenzuli (playing against Yugoslavia)

External links
 Group 8 at UEFA.com

Group 8